James Robert Smith may refer to:
James Robert Smith (RAF officer) (1891–after 1919), World War I flying ace
Bob Smith (defensive back, born 1925) or James Robert Smith (1925–2002), American football defensive back and halfback
James Robert Smith (author) (born 1957), American author

See also
James Smith (disambiguation)